Qomiabad (also Romanized as Qomīābād and Qamīābād) is a village in Qaleh Now Rural District, Qaleh Now District, Ray County, Tehran Province, Iran. At the 2006 census, its population was 732, in 185 families.

References 

Populated places in Ray County, Iran